The Charlotte Hornets are an American professional basketball team based in Charlotte, North Carolina. They play in the Southeast Division of the Eastern Conference in the National Basketball Association (NBA). The Hornets began playing in 1988 as an expansion team, before relocating to New Orleans in 2002 and renaming themselves as the Pelicans in 2013. Charlotte was then awarded a new expansion team named the Bobcats in 2004, which reassumed the Hornets name in 2014.  In a deal with the NBA and Pelicans, the renamed Hornets also reclaimed the history and records of the original Hornets from 1988 to 2002, while all of the original Hornets' records from 2002 to 2013 will remain with the Pelicans.

The Hornets franchise have played their home games at the Spectrum Center, formerly known as the Charlotte Bobcats Arena and the Time Warner Cable Arena, since 2005. The Hornets are owned by Michael Jordan.

There have been 10 head coaches for the Hornets franchise. The franchise's first head coach was Dick Harter, who coached for two seasons. Allan Bristow and Steve Clifford are the franchise's all-time leader for the most regular-season games coached (410); Bristow is also the franchise's all-time leader for the most regular-season game wins (207); Dave Cowens is the franchise's all-time leader for the highest winning percentage in the regular season (.609); Paul Silas is the franchise's all-time leader for the most playoff games coached (23), and the most playoff-game wins (11). Harter, Bristow, Sam Vincent and Mike Dunlap have spent their entire NBA coaching careers with the Hornets franchise. Larry Brown is the only coach of the franchise to have been elected into the Basketball Hall of Fame as a coach. The most recent head coach of the Hornets was James Borrego.

Key

Coaches

Notes
A running total of the number of coaches of the Bobcats/Hornets. Thus, any coach who has two or more separate terms as head coach is only counted once.
Each year is linked to an article about that particular NBA season.
 Paul Silas has a combined total of 401 regular season games coached, with a W–L record of 193–208, for a  winning percentage during his non-consecutive tenures in Charlotte.

Franchise leaders
All-time leaders – as of the end of the 2021–22 NBA season. Bold denotes active coach with the team.

Most Games Coached
 Allan Bristow – 410
 Steve Clifford – 410
 Paul Silas – 401
 James Borrego – 301
 Bernie Bickerstaff – 246

Most Wins Coached
 Allan Bristow – 207
 Steve Clifford – 196
 Paul Silas – 193
 James Borrego – 138
 Dave Cowens – 109

Best Winning %
 Dave Cowens – .609
 Allan Bristow – .505
 Paul Silas – .481
 Steve Clifford – .478
 Larry Brown – .458

Most Playoff Games Coached
 Paul Silas – 23
 Allan Bristow – 13
 Dave Cowens – 12
 Steve Clifford – 11
 Larry Brown – 4

Most Playoff Wins Coached
 Paul Silas – 11
 Allan Bristow – 5
 Dave Cowens – 4
 Steve Clifford – 3

Best Playoff Winning %
 Paul Silas – .478
 Allan Bristow – .385
 Dave Cowens – .333
 Steve Clifford – .273

References
General

Specific

Lists of National Basketball Association head coaches by team

Head coaches